Robert Dickinson (born July 25, 1954) is a television lighting designer.  His career, spanning decades, has focussed on awards shows, music shows, game shows, talk shows, and special events, which make up his over 1500 on screen television credits.  In 1990 Dickinson founded Full Flood, Inc., a consortium of lighting designers and directors of photography for the multi-camera television industry.  Dickinson has been involved with many high-profile shows, including the Academy Awards, multiple Super Bowl Halftime Shows, multiple Olympic Opening Ceremonies, the 2010 Shanghai Expo, among others.

Biography 

Dickinson was born in the UK before moving to Kansas at the age of two.  Shortly thereafter his family moved to Southern California where he remains to this day.  Dickinson's break into the industry came when joining the stagehands union.  He quickly moved into lighting direction, working under industry leader Imero Fiorentino.  His breakthrough show Solid Gold garnered him his first Emmy win at the age of 29, and was the catalyst that lead to an exploding career in Television Lighting.

In 2005 Dickinson was awarded an honorary Doctorate of Fine Arts from Carnegie Mellon University.

Aesthetic 

Dickinson pioneered the use of moving lights in television lighting design, starting with the 1983 Academy Awards.  He is known for his "ceiling of light" approach, and the use of floor lights.  On key lighting, Dickinson says: "I have a tendency to take risks. I don't key light in a predictable manner; I do it in an appropriate manner. "

Work of Full Flood

Large Scale Events 
Baku 2015 European Games Opening Ceremony 
Vancouver 2010 Winter Olympic Games Opening, Closing and Medals Ceremonies 
Shanghai Expo 2010 Opening Ceremony 
Five Democratic National Conventions: 2012, 2008, 2004, 2000 and 1996 
Opening Ceremony of the 2007 Special Olympics in Shanghai, China 
Athens 2004 Summer Olympic Games Opening and Closing Ceremonies 
Salt Lake 2002 Winter Olympic Games Opening, and Closing Ceremonies 
Atlanta 1996 Summer Olympic Games Opening and Closing Ceremonies

Awards Shows 

The Academy Awards 
The Grammy Awards 
The Primetime Emmy Awards 
The Daytime Emmy Awards 
The Tony Awards 
The Country Music Association Awards 
The Kids’ Choice Awards 
The American Music Awards 
The Academy of Country Music Awards 
The Golden Globe Awards 
The Billboard Awards 
The Comedy Awards 
The ESPY Awards 
The BET Awards 
The BET Hip Hop Awards 
The NFL Honors 
The Scream Awards 
The Kennedy Center Honors 
The American Film Institute Lifetime Achievement Award

Television Specials 

The Miss USA Pageant 
The Lincoln Memorial Inaugural Concert at Inauguration 2009: “We Are One” 
An Inauguration Celebration 2009: “The Neighborhood Ball” 
VH1 Divas 
VH1 Rock Honors 
Christmas in Washington 
Five Victoria's Secret Fashion Shows 
Thirteen Super Bowl Halftime Shows featuring such singers and musicians as:
Bruce Springsteen and the E Street Band, Tom Petty and the Heartbreakers, Prince, The Rolling Stones, U2, Aerosmith, ‘N Sync, Britney Spears, Mary J. Blige, Nelly, Stevie Wonder, Gloria Estefan, Big Bad Voodoo Daddy, Savion Glover, Boyz II Men, Smokey Robinson, Martha Reeves, The Temptations, Queen Latifah, The Blues Brothers (Dan Aykroyd, John Goodman and Jim Belushi), ZZ Top, James Brown, Diana Ross, Clint Black, Tanya Tucker, Travis Tritt, The Judds and Michael Jackson

Television Series 

Conan on TBS 
The Ellen DeGeneres Show 
The Tonight Show with Conan O'Brien 
Duets

Installation 

The Shanghai Corporate Pavilion at Shanghai Expo 2010

Concerts and Music Events 

James Taylor “One Man Band” 
The Eagles “Hell Freezers Over” 
Harry Connick, Jr. World Tour 
Harry Connick, Jr. Live on Broadway 
Fleetwood Mac “The Dance” 
Celine Dion “These Are Special Times” 
Ricky Martin “One Night Only” 
Jessica Simpson “Tour Of Duty” 
Justin Timberlake “Down Home In Memphis” 
Willie Nelson “Willie and Friends” 
Harry Connick Jr. “Christmas Special” 
‘N Sync “The Atlantis Concert” 
'N Sync "‘Ntimate Holiday Special”

Live Events Adapted To The Screen 

Neil Diamond “Live At Madison Square Garden” 
Shania Twain “Shania Up! Live In Chicago” 
Cher "The Farewell Tour" 
Barbra Streisand's Millennium Concert “Timeless” 
The Backstreet Boys “Larger Than Life”

Primetime Emmy Awards and Nominations

References

External links 
 
 

American lighting designers
American cinematographers
Living people
1954 births
Long Beach Polytechnic High School alumni
English emigrants to the United States